, is a Shinto shrine in Shibuya, Tokyo, that is dedicated to the deified spirits of Emperor Meiji and his wife, Empress Shōken. The shrine does not contain the emperor's grave, which is located at Fushimi-momoyama, south of Kyoto.

History

After the emperor's death in 1912, the Japanese Diet passed a resolution to commemorate his role in the Meiji Restoration.  An iris garden in an area of Tokyo where Emperor Meiji and Empress Shōken had been known to visit was chosen as the building's location.Beppyo shrines

Construction began in 1915 under Itō Chūta, and the shrine was built in the traditional nagare-zukuri style, using primarily Japanese cypress and copper. The building of the shrine was a national project, mobilizing youth groups and other civic associations from throughout Japan, who contributed labor and funding. The main timbers came from Kiso in Nagano, and Alishan in Taiwan, then a Japanese territory, with materials being utilized from every Japanese prefecture, including Karafuto, Korea, Kwantung, and Taiwan. It was estimated that the cost of the construction was ¥5,219,00 in 1920 (approximately US$26 million today), about a quarter of the actual cost due to the donated materials and labor.

It was formally dedicated on November 3, 1920, completed in 1921, and its grounds officially finished by 1926. The interior volume of the shrine complex when originally built was 650 tsubo.  Until 1946, the Meiji Shrine was officially designated one of the Kanpei-taisha, meaning that it stood in the first rank of government supported shrines.

The original building was destroyed during the Tokyo air raids of World War II. The present iteration of the shrine was funded through a public fund raising effort and completed in October 1958.

Meiji Shrine has been visited by numerous foreign politicians, including United States President George W. Bush, United States Secretary of State Hillary Clinton, and German Foreign Minister Guido Westerwelle.
Kanpei-taisha

Shrine complex

This area is covered by an evergreen forest that consists of 120,000 trees of 365 different species, which were donated by people from all parts of Japan when the shrine was established. The forest is visited by many as a recreation and relaxation area in the center of Tokyo. The entrance to the shrine complex leads through the Jingu Bashi bridge. Meiji Shrine is adjacent to Yoyogi Park which together is a large forested area. The entrances open at sunrise and close at sunset.

The shrine itself is composed of two major areas:

Naien
The Naien is the inner precinct, which is centered on the shrine buildings and includes a treasure museum that houses articles of the Emperor and Empress. The treasure museum is built in the Azekurazukuri style.

Gaien
The Gaien is the outer precinct, which includes the Meiji Memorial Picture Gallery that houses a collection of 80 large murals illustrative of the events in the lives of the Emperor and his consort. It also includes a variety of sports facilities, including the national stadiums (Meiji Jingu Gaien Stadium, National Stadium, and the newer National Stadium), and the Meiji Memorial Hall (Meiji Kinenkan), which was originally used for governmental meetings, including discussions surrounding the drafting of the Meiji Constitution in the late 19th century. Today it is used for Shinto weddings as well as meeting rooms rent and restaurants services.

Festivals
Several festivals are held at the shrine per year. Some festivals are held annually. The exhibitions range from ice carving, shodoten (calligraphy winners's works), bonsai, Suiseki Masterpieces, Memory Dolls, Chrysanthemums, Dahlia and exhibitions at the Treasure Museum Annex. 

 A ring-entering ceremony by a Yokozuna, called , is performed at the shrine in January (usually around January 5-7) and during the Autumn Festival. Also newly promoted Yokozuna usually perform their first ring-entering ceremony here.
 Autumn Grand Festival (From October 31 to November 3)
October 31 - Autumn Grand Festival Bugaku at the main shrine building
November 1 - Autumn Grand Festival: Enshrinement Anniversary Ceremony, Afternoon Ceremony
November 2 - Autumn Grand Festival Morning Ceremony
November 3 - Autumn Grand Festival Anniversary of Emperor Meiji's Birthday

Gallery

See also

List of Jingū
List of Shinto shrines
Meiji Jingu Stadium

Notes

References
Ponsonby-Fane, Richard Arthur Brabazon. (1959).  The Imperial House of Japan. Kyoto: Ponsonby Memorial Society. OCLC 194887

External links

Official English site
Meiji Shrine English map
Meiji Shrine Pictures & Travel Guide
Japanese-English Translation Practical guide for travelers

1920 establishments in Japan
Buildings and structures in Japan destroyed during World War II
Buildings and structures in Shibuya
Emperor Meiji
Jingū
Religious buildings and structures completed in 1958
Shinto shrines in Tokyo